Lucien Francis Barr (August 22, 1903 – April 23, 1983) was an American aviator, businessman, and politician.

Barr was born in Lawrence County, Illinois. In 1918, he joined the United States Army and served in the cavalry. He then served in the United States Army Air Corps and learned how to fly. In 1924, he moved to Detroit, Michigan and joined the Michigan National Guard, where he was a pilot in the 107th Observation Squadron.He was a lieutenant.

He moved to Alaska Territory and formed the North Canada Air Express and flew in the Atlin, Canada and Juneau, Alaska Territory, United States. In 1937, he moved with his wife to Fairbanks, Alaska Territory. He then worked for the Alaska Airlines from 1946 to 1956. Barr served in the Alaska Territorial Senate from 1949 to 1953 and was a Democrat. He served in the Alaska Constitutional Convention of 1955-1956 and also briefly as a United States marshal. In 1956, Barr and his wife moved to Portland, Oregon where they owned a trailer park. In 1974, Barr and his wife moved to Grants Pass, Oregon. He died of cancer there in 1983. He is buried at the Hillcrest Memorial Park Cemetery, Grants Pass, Oregon.

Notes

Further reading
Frank Barr: Alaskan Pioneer Bush Pilot and One-man Airline (Caribou Classics) September 1, 1999
Frank Barr: Bush Pilot and Alaska and the Yukon (Edmonds: Alaska Northwest Publishing Company, 1986

External links

1903 births
1983 deaths
20th-century American politicians
20th-century American businesspeople
Burials in Oregon
People from Lawrence County, Illinois
Politicians from Fairbanks, Alaska
People from Grants Pass, Oregon
Military personnel from Detroit
Military personnel from Illinois
Aviators from Alaska
Businesspeople from Portland, Oregon
Alaska Democrats
Members of the Alaska Territorial Legislature
United States Marshals
Deaths from cancer in Oregon
Businesspeople from Fairbanks, Alaska
Military personnel from Fairbanks, Alaska
United States Army Air Forces officers
Michigan National Guard personnel
United States Army Air Forces pilots